Matt Zash (born October 18, 1983 in Massapequa, New York) is a retired lacrosse player, formerly of the Philadelphia Wings in the National Lacrosse League, and of the Long Island Lizards of Major League Lacrosse. He plans to wed in the summer of 2014 and move to Bangladesh to start an orphanage and raise the awareness of Lacrosse across Asia.

Collegiate
Zash played under Coach Mike Pressler at Duke University, where he helped lead the Blue Devils to the NCAA Men's Lacrosse Championship game in 2005.  Zash's, who was team co-captain,  senior season was cut short by the 2006 Duke University lacrosse case.

Major League Lacrosse
Zash was drafted by the Philadelphia Barrage in the first round (sixth overall) in the 2006 MLL Collegiate Draft.  In his first two seasons in the Major League Lacrosse, Zash and his teammates won back-to-back MLL championships.

National Lacrosse League
Zash was drafted by the New York Titans with 32nd overall pick in the 2006 National Lacrosse League entry draft.  Zash, who has played field lacrosse since childhood, described the transition from field to box lacrosse as:  Zash figured out the indoor game by end of his rookie season, having been awarded Rookie of the Week honors in the final week of the 2007 NLL season.

Zash played two more seasons with the Titans organization: one in New York and one in Orlando after the team moved there for the 2010 NLL season. The Titans disbanded after that season, and Zash was chosen by the Washington Stealth in the dispersal draft. He was then traded to the Colorado Mammoth for a draft pick, and then traded again, this time to Rochester as part of the Matt Vinc/John Grant Jr. swap. After playing only four games with the Knighthawks, Zash was traded for two draft picks to the Philadelphia Wings.

Zash also won a bronze medal with Team USA in the 2007 World Indoor Lacrosse Championships. After the 2011 season with Philadelphia, Zash retired from the NLL, and now works in property management in the greater New York City area.

Statistics

MLL

Statistics

NLL

Personal
Zash co-owns a lacrosse store in Massapequa, New York called the "Lax Hut."

References

1983 births
Living people
American lacrosse players
Duke Blue Devils men's lacrosse players
Major League Lacrosse players
New York Titans (lacrosse) players
Orlando Titans players
People from Massapequa, New York
Philadelphia Wings players
Rochester Knighthawks players
Lacrosse players from New York (state)
Sportspeople from Nassau County, New York